Stilpnopappus is a genus of Brazilian plants in the Vernonieae within the daisy family.

 Species

 formerly included
see Caatinganthus Xiphochaeta 
 Stilpnopappus aquaticus - Xiphochaeta aquatica
 Stilpnopappus aquaticus - Xiphochaeta aquatica 
 Stilpnopappus rubropappus - Caatinganthus rubropappus 
 Stilpnopappus viridis -  Xiphochaeta aquatica

References

Asteraceae genera
Flora of Brazil
Vernonieae